Dzmitry Girs (born 11 June 1997) is a Belarusian professional footballer who plays for Slutsk.

References

External links 
 
 

1997 births
Living people
Belarusian footballers
Association football midfielders
FC Energetik-BGU Minsk players
FC Smolevichi players
FC Granit Mikashevichi players
FC Slutsk players